No, the Case Is Happily Resolved is a 1973 Italian crime drama film written and directed  by Vittorio Salerno and starring Enzo Cerusico, Riccardo Cucciolla and Martine Brochard. The finale of the film was re-shot after the distribution company requested a change to the original bleak ending.

Plot
While fishing and listening to a football game, rail worker Fabio Santamaria hears a woman screaming. When he investigates, he discovers a man has beaten a woman to death. He flees. On his way home, he attempts to find a police station to report the crime but gets nervous and continues home. Once there, he is too afraid to report them crime. Eventually, he finds out through the newspaper that the murderer, a distinguished professor, has gone to the police and described him as the murderer. Initially Fabio, still too afraid to go to the police, attempts to cover up his involvement: he buys new sunglasses to replace the pair he lost, he throws away his flannel shirt and boots, shaves off his mustache, and repaints his car. So by the time a priest convinces him to tell the police what he knows, he has incriminated himself (for example, the police find his sunglasses and match his fingerprints) and the police believe Professor Ranieri over him and convict him of the murder. In the original ending a reporter investigating the story, Don Peppino, confronts the Professor, who drives away. In the reshot theatrical release, Don Peppino's confrontation of Professor Ranieri prompts him to kill himself, and a final scene relates that the professor has cleared Fabio of the crime in his suicide note, and so Fabio, cheerful in prison, is expecting release.

Cast

Enzo Cerusico as Fabio Santamaria
Riccardo Cucciolla as Professor Eduardo Ranieri
Martine Brochard as Cinzia 
 Junie Vetusto as The Concierge's Daughter
Enrico Maria Salerno as Giuseppe Ferdinando Giannoli aka "Don Peppino"
 Loredana Martínez as Olga Poddu
Umberto Raho as Don Giulio  
 Claudio Nicastro as Dr. Rocchi, Chief of Police
 Luigi Casellato as Police Inspector
Enzo Garinei as "Gazzetta Sera"’s editor in chief
 Eleonora Mauro as  "Grissino"
 Nazzareno Natale as Augusto 
 Gualtiero Rispoli as Marshall  Basile

Release
Originally released in 1973, No, the Case is Happily Resolved was released on Blu-ray in 2021 by Arrow as part of its Years of Lead collection.

References

External links

Italian crime drama films
1973 crime drama films
1973 films
Films about miscarriage of justice
Films scored by Riz Ortolani
1970s Italian-language films
1970s Italian films